Greased Lightning is a surviving 1919 American silent comedy film directed by Jerome Storm and written by Julien Josephson. The film stars Charles Ray, Wanda Hawley, Robert McKim, Willis Marks, Bert Woodruff, and J. P. Lockney. The film was released on April 27, 1919, by Paramount Pictures.

Plot
As described in a film magazine, village blacksmith Andy Fletcher (Ray) is about to purchase a new car when Laban Flint (Marks), the town banker, warns him to stay clear of his daughter Alice (Hawley) with the vehicle. Since Alice was the cause of Andy's desire in making the purchase, he is dissuaded. But a lucky trade brings a motored relic into his possession and Flint is pacified. During a drive into the country with Alice and her father, the car breaks down and an estrangement ensues when Alice departs in the elegant machine of Alden J. Armitage (McKim), a wealthy investor recently come to Piperville. Some time later Armitage arranges an automobile race and Andy enters his chassis. While the race is on, Armitage robs the bank and flees. Andy pursues in his car and captures the robber.

Cast

Charles Ray as Andy Fletcher
Wanda Hawley as Alice Flint
Robert McKim as Alden J. Armitage
Willis Marks as Laban Flint
Bert Woodruff as Grandpa Piper
J. P. Lockney as Milt Barlow
Otto Hoffman as Rufus Shadd

Preservation status
A print survives in the Gosfilmofond, Russian film archive.

References

External links 

 
 

1919 films
1919 comedy films
1910s English-language films
American auto racing films
Silent American comedy films
Paramount Pictures films
Films directed by Jerome Storm
American black-and-white films
American silent feature films
1910s American films